Pascal Fils (born July 29, 1984) is a former professional Canadian football running back who played for the Edmonton Eskimos of the Canadian Football League. He signed as an undrafted free agent with the Eskimos in May 2010 following the 2010 CFL Draft. He played college football for the Sherbrooke Vert et Or where he was a four-year starter at running back. He is francophone.

References

External links
Edmonton Eskimos player bio

1984 births
Living people
Canadian football running backs
Edmonton Elks players
Players of Canadian football from Quebec
Sherbrooke Vert et Or football players
Canadian football people from Montreal